Moolthan is a village in Ferozepur Jhirka sub-division of Nuh District in Haryana state, India. The village lies in the Mewat region of Delhi NCR. It is located on Delhi Mumbai Expressway on the Haryana-Rajasthan border.

Demography 
It had a population of 2,732 in 498 houses as per 2011 Census of India,
with a literacy rate of 55.90% compared to 75.55% of Haryana, Male literacy of 72.08% and female literacy of 38.27%. Out of the population, 1426 persons were recorded as male and 1306 as female.

Administration
Moolthan village local governance is managed by the elected panchayat headed by the Sarpanch.

See also 
 Bhiwadi
 Bhadas
 Gurgaon

References 

Villages in Nuh district